Celeryville is an unincorporated community and census-designated place (CDP) on the boundary between New Haven and Richmond townships in Huron County, Ohio, United States. As of the 2010 census the population of the community was 210.

History
Celeryville was originally settled chiefly by Dutch immigrants; the village was named for the celery farms near the original town site.

Geography
Celeryville is located in southwestern Huron County at 41.029N, -82.731W. The center of the community is on the border of New Haven Township and Richmond Township. State Route 103, following the township border, is the main road through the community, leading north  to the center of Willard and southwest  to New Washington. Bullhead Road forms the northern edge of Celeryville, leading east  to New Haven.

Celeryville is a unique agricultural community. The soil of farmlands is muck. It is so rich that several years ago it caught fire. Farmers are able to grow vegetables much faster than other areas and can get one or two extra crops in a growing season. Ohio State University maintains an agricultural extension there. Migrant workers come yearly to tend and harvest the crops.

Demographics

Education
The Willard Area School District serves residents of Celeryville. The community is also the home of Celeryville Christian School, a pre-K-8 school.

References

External links 
Basic Information: Celeryville

Census-designated places in Huron County, Ohio
Census-designated places in Ohio
Dutch-American culture in Ohio